The East Branch of the Dead Diamond River is a  river in northern New Hampshire in the United States.  It is a tributary of the Dead Diamond River, located in the Androscoggin River watershed of Maine and New Hampshire.

The East Branch of the Dead Diamond River rises in the town of Pittsburg between  Stub Hill and  Diamond Ridge. Nearly the entire length of the river is in Pittsburg, with a small portion at its southern end in the Atkinson and Gilmanton Academy Grant. A highlight along the river are the  Garfield Falls.

See also

List of rivers of New Hampshire

References

Rivers of New Hampshire
Rivers of Coös County, New Hampshire